Joseph Kallarangatt (born 27 January 1956) is an Indian Catholic prelate and theologian, who is the 3rd Bishop of the Syro-Malabar Catholic Eparchy of Palai. He was ordained as a priest in 1982, later received a doctorate in theology (ThD) from the Gregorian University in Rome, Italy and was appointed as the Bishop of Palai after the resignation of Bishop Joseph Pallikaparambil in 2004. He was initially an assistant parish priest and became a theologian and seminary teacher after his ThD. Following his appointment as a bishop he was able to gain considerable influence within the hierarchy of the Syro-Malabar Church, an Eastern Catholic church within the Catholic Church, and has been regularly selected to participate in various high-profile ecclesiastical ceremonies and duties of the Syro-Malabar Church. He was also appointed to head the doctrinal commission for determining of the Catholic Church's stance towards yoga, which concluded that the practice was incompatible with the Christian faith.

Kallarangatt is involved in a number of controversies over providing sops to influence Syro-Malabar Christian women to have four or more children, and promoting conspiracy theories such as "love jihad" and "narcotics jihad". He has also been accused of using the love and narcotics jihad controversy as a distraction from the sexual assault and corruption allegations surrounding the church and to forge an alliance with the Hindutva movement in India, in an effort to prevent corruption investigations from agencies under the Narendra Modi government.

Early life and career 
Joseph Kallarangatt was born on 27 January 1956, in Kayyoor located in the Kottayam district of Kerala. He received his education at a Catholic seminary in Palai and became an ordained priest on 2 January 1982. Kallarangatt was an assistant parish priest at the Aruvithura and Ramapuram parishes until he was sent to the Gregorian University in Rome, Italy in 1984, from where he attained a doctorate in theology (ThD). Following his ThD, he became a teacher at a seminary in Vadavathoor and later the president of the Pontifical Oriental Institute of Religious Studies (Paurastya Vidyapitam), a theology institution of the Syro-Malabar Catholic Church.

Pastoral ministry

2004–2018: Rise to prominence 
On 18 March 2004, Kallarangatt was appointed as the 3rd Bishop of the Syro-Malabar Catholic Eparchy of Palai, after the resignation of Bishop Joseph Pallikaparambil. His episcopal consecration occurred on 2 May 2004 conducted by Archbishop of Changanacherry Joseph Powathil and his enthronement was conducted by Cardinal Varkey Vithayathil. Later he also received an appointed to the chairmanship of the Synodal Commission for Family, Laity and Life. The diocese (eparchy) of Palai has the largest concentration of Syro-Malabar Catholics in Kerala, from where Kallarangatt's clout in the church grew considerably and he became known as an authority on theology, eventually authoring 30 books on the subject.

The 31st plenary meeting of the CBCI was held at Alphonsian Pastoral Institute Pala from 05 to 12 February 2014 under the patronage of Joseph Kallarangatt as the local host.

On 28 August 2016, Kallarangatt was sent to Preston, United Kingdom along with Cardinal and Major Archbishop George Alencherry, the head of the Syro-Malabar Catholic Church to adorne Joseph Srampickal with the insignia of Episcopacy. Srampickal, a priest from Palai was appointed by Pope Francis as the bishop-elect to the newly founded diocese of the Syro-Malabar Church in the United Kingdom. He was also designated to act as the co-celebrant along with former Archbishop Powathil for the ordination ceremony of Thomas Tharayil's appointment as the auxiliary bishop to the Syro-Malabar Catholic Archeparchy of Changanacherry. The ceremony was held on 23 April 2017 and presided over by the Archbishop of Changanacherry, Joseph Perumthottam who acted as the principal celebrant. In early 2018, Kallarangatt headed a doctrinal committee of the church, which produced a report concluding that the practice of yoga was incompatible with Christian beliefs. The report stated that yoga could be practised for health benefits but to interpret results from it as spiritual benefits had far reaching and dangerous consequences.

2018–2021: Controversies in the church 
In early September 2018, the church became the subject of a major controversy after a group of nuns led protests over inaction against Bishop Franco Mulakkal, accused of having raped and sexually exploited a nun multiple times over a period of 2 years. The nun was complaining to various authorities in the church hierarchy since 2017 but it had elicited no response. She eventually lodged a police complaint against Mulakkal on 28 June 2018, the protesting nuns stated that Mulakkal had powerful supporters within the church. Bishop Kallarangatt was one of the first church authorities she had confided to back in June 2017. During the police investigation, he was brought in for questioning and stated that the nun had only made a verbal complaint with him and not a written one. Mulakkal was later arrested in September 2018 and the Palai diocese extended its support for him.

On 3 February 2020, Kallarangatt presided over the consecration function for Jose Pulickal's appointment as the 4th Bishop of the Syro-Malabar Catholic Eparchy of Kanjirappally. In July 2021, as part of the "Year of the Family" celebrations, the Palai diocese devised a welfare scheme seeking to increase birth rates among Catholic women by offering financial assistance of ₹1,500 per month, admissions with scholarships at the church-run St. Joseph's College of Engineering and Technology, Palai and free medical facilities for every child born after the 4th child of couples married post 2000. The announcement of the scheme by Kallarangatt caused controversy but he defended it, stating that he stood by the scheme and that it was announced to support large families facing financial difficulties due to the COVID-19 pandemic. He further stated that they would begin taking applications and will be able to provide benefits from August onwards. It was criticised for ignoring the large population boom in India and for going against the existent two-child norm in Kerala, the critics from within the Syro-Malabar community described it as an unethical and immoral scheme created for petty political gains and as interference in the sexual lives of married couples by unmarried clergy. The scheme of the Palai Bishop was followed by an announcement from the Church that extended free of cost neonatal care to women giving birth to their fourth child in Church run hospitals, and scholarships for the fourth and subsequent children of families who get admitted at Church run engineering colleges.

2021 Love and narcotics jihad controversy 
On 8 September 2021, Bishop Kallarangatt sparked a major controversy during a sermon at Kuravilangad Church, when he claimed that the conspiracy theory of "love jihad" was real and that there was also a "narcotics jihad" targeting youths as a means of indirect war to annihilate the non-Muslim population.He described "narcotics jihad" as being evident everywhere from ice cream parlours, juice corners, rave parties and hotels where youths were trapped into drug addiction and their lives spoilt. The remarks attracted immediate and widespread condemnation from within the Christian community. Representatives of the non-Catholic denominations were more vocal in their opposition though there were responses of disapproval from the other autonomous Syro-Malankara Catholic Church and the Roman Catholic Church in India as well. Metropolitan Bishop Yuhanon Mor Meletius of the Jacobite Christian denomination and Metropolitan Bishop Coorilose Geevarghese of the Orthodox Christian denomination, both part of Oriental Orthodoxy expressed the strongest condemnations stating that Kallarangatt had fallen into the design of the Sangh Parivar and was creating divisions among minorities with conspiracy theories at a time of growing fascism in India which threatened all of them. Metropolitan Theodosius Mar Thoma, the head of the Eastern Protestant Saint Thomas Christian denomination also openly derided Kallarangatt for attempting to aggravate communal divisions in Kerala.

From within the Syro-Malabar Church, the former spokesman of the Synod, Father Paul Thelakkat criticised Kallarangatt for having a prejudiced view of Christian women stating that the majority of medical nurses providing brave service were Christian women while "he sees them as easy prey to any sinister gang and goon" and admonished him for going against Pope Francis's efforts to improve relations with other religious communities. Nuns affiliated to the church held a walkout protest against hate speech by Kallanragatt and his supporters, after another priest endorsed him and called for economic boycott of Muslims. Senior Nun Teena Jose demanded Kallrangatt to apologise, accusing him of playing immoral politics and not practising Christ's commandment of love. According to her, Christians are moving away from religion while the bishop is abusing the trust of the religious laity with bizarre explanations rather than trying to bring the irreligious back to the faith. She alleged that he was trying to strengthen an extremist faction of clergy within the church and dishonestly trying to realign it with the Bharatiya Janata Party to meet his own ends. The Syro-Malabar Catholic Church is traditionally aligned with the Indian National Congress in its opposition to the Communists in the state. The Catholic oriented Joint Christian Council (JCC) and the Kerala Catholic Reformation Movement (KCRM) criticised Kallarangatt on similar lines, raising concerns that the controversy was purposeful to distract from the sexual assault and corruption allegations surrounding the church's top leadership and created to forge an alliance with the Sangh Parivar in exchange for warding off investigations from agencies of the Narendra Modi government.

There were also strong condemnations from Muslim organisations who stated that such remarks coming from a bishop was unexpected; criticisms of his statement were made that described it as promoting prejudice against Muslims among Christians and involved varied demands for retraction, apologies, evidence and clarifications. Some of them organised a protest march in Palai to the Bishop's House demanding legal action against him, it saw the participation of 200 people. It led to a counter protest by supporters of the bishop along with the involvement of several local politicians. Both the marches were broken off by the police and participants charged for violation of COVID-19 protocols. The Hindutva proponent right wing Bharatiya Janata Party extended its full support to the bishop claiming that he was revealing the "truth" of a widespread conspiracy that everyone else was trying to hide, several senior state functionaries of the party visited him at his residence after the protests. Joseph Perumthottam, the Archbishop of his ecclesiastical province, Changanacherry had also granted his support to Kallarangatt. He endorsed the bishop through an article in the church controlled newspaper Deepika. The Kerala Catholic Bishops' Council (KCBC) in which Kallarangatt and Perumthottam held influential positions released a statement declaring that it stood by the bishop. The JCC stated that the two clashing protest marches could have led to a riot, and held a protest of their own demanded Kallarangatt to release a apology and raised concerns that the Changanacherry lobby was hijacking the church.

The Pala diocese issued a clarification stating that the bishop did not imply that all Muslims were doing so but only a small minority of extremists who were true believers. The same message was reiterated in communications from the KCBC and Archbishop Perumthottam. The chairman of the Kerala Congress (M), a member party of the Left Democratic Front, the communist led ruling coalition in Kerala also extended his support, criticising opponents of the bishop and accusing them of misrepresenting the bishop's statement.

The Chief Minister of Kerala, Pinarayi Vijayan, a member of the Communist Party of India (Marxist), the largest party in the Left Democratic Front stated that it was the first time he was hearing about such a thing as "narcotics jihad" and that Kallarangatt being an influential and learned man should think before speaking and remember his civil obligation of not creating divisions in society, an obligation which all religious leaders have. In addition, he stated drug trafficking and consumption of narcotics were are a serious criminal and social issue respectively but could not be tied to religious affiliations, and that allegations of "narcotics jihad" and "love jihad" were delusional with no evidential support, citing data on interfaith marriages and on suspects and convicts in narcotics cases whose affiliations did not have any unusual ratios and reflected the general distribution of religious identities in the population of the state. Responding to demands of legal action, he stated that the government will not initiate any as the bishop was within his rights to address his sermon's attendees and because he did not intend to cause any communal enmity.

A case was registered against Kallarangatt by the Kerala Police in November 2021 over his remarks.

References

External links

1956 births
20th-century Indian Roman Catholic theologians
Living people
Syro-Malabar bishops
People from Pala, Kerala
Christian clergy from Kottayam